Montagnard is an umbrella term for the various indigenous peoples of the Central Highlands of Vietnam. The French term  signifies a mountain dweller, and is a carryover from the French colonial period in Vietnam. In Vietnamese, they are known by the term người Thượng, although this term can also be applied to other minority ethnic groups in Vietnam. In modern Vietnam, both terms are archaic, and indigenous ethnic groups are referred to as đồng bào or người dân tộc thiểu số. Earlier they were referred to pejoratively as the mọi. Sometimes the term Degar is used for the group as well. Most of those living in the United States refer to themselves as Montagnards, while those living in Vietnam refer to themselves by their individual ethnic group.

The Montagnards are most covered in English-language scholarship for their participation in the Vietnam War, where they were heavily recruited by the Army of the Republic of Vietnam (ARVN) and its American and Australian allies.  The Montagnards tended to be Christian at a higher proportion than that of the Viets, and the North Vietnamese were seen by some Montagnards as propounding a heavily centralized state that would not value Montagnard local priorities or religious practices.

Ethnic groups

Below is a list of officially recognized ethnic groups in Vietnam that are indigenous to the Central Highlands and nearby areas, with a total population of approximately 2.25 million. They speak Austroasiatic languages of the Katuic and Bahnaric branches, as well as Chamic languages (which belong to the Austronesian language family). Population statistics are from the 2009 Vietnam Population Census.

 Katuic speakers:
 Bru (2009 population: 74,506): Quảng Trị province
 Katu (2009 population: 61,588): Quảng Nam province
 Tà Ôi (2009 population: 43,886): Thừa Thiên-Huế province and Quảng Trị province
 Bahnaric speakers:
 West Bahnaric
 Brau (2009 population: 397): Kon Tum province
 East Bahnaric
 Cor (2009 population: 33,817): Quảng Ngãi province
 North Bahnaric
 Xo Dang (2009 population: 169,501): Kon Tum province and Quảng Nam province
 H're  (2009 population: 127,420): Quảng Ngãi province
 Rơ Măm (2009 population: 436): Kon Tum province
 Central Bahnaric
 Bahnar (2009 population: 227,741): Gia Lai province and Kon Tum province
 Jeh-Tariang (2009 population: 50,962): Kon Tum province and Quảng Nam province
 South Bahnaric
 Cho Ro (2009 population: 26,855): Đồng Nai province
 Koho (2009 population: 166,112): Lâm Đồng province
 Mạ (2009 population: 41,405): Lâm Đồng province
 Stieng (2009 population: 85,436): Bình Phước province
 Mnong (2009 population: 102,741): Đắk Lắk province and Đắk Nông province
 Chamic speakers:
 Chams (2009 population: 161,729): Ninh Thuận province and Bình Thuận province
 Churu (2009 population: 19,314): Lâm Đồng province
 Rade (2009 population: 331,194): Đắk Lắk province
 Jarai (2009 population: 411,275): Gia Lai province
 Raglai (2009 population: 122,245): Ninh Thuận province and Khánh Hòa province

Listed by province, from north to south as well as west to east:
 Quảng Trị province: Bru (Katuic), Ta Oi (Katuic)
 Thừa Thiên-Huế province: Ta Oi (Katuic)
 Quảng Nam province: Katu (Katuic), Xo Dang (North Bahnaric), Jeh-Tariang (Central Bahnaric)
 Quảng Ngãi province: H're (North Bahnaric), Cor (East Bahnaric)
Kon Tum Province: Jeh-Tariang (Central Bahnaric), Bahnar (Central Bahnaric), Xo Dang (North Bahnaric), Rơ Măm (North Bahnaric), Brau (West Bahnaric)
 Gia Lai province: Jarai (Chamic), Bahnar (Central Bahnaric)
 Đắk Lắk province: Rade (Chamic), Mnong (South Bahnaric)
 Khánh Hòa province: Raglai (Chamic)
 Đắk Nông province: Mnong (South Bahnaric)
 Lâm Đồng province: Churu (Chamic), Mạ (South Bahnaric), Ko Ho (South Bahnaric)
 Ninh Thuận province: Raglai (Chamic), Chams (Chamic)
 Bình Phước province: Stieng (South Bahnaric)
 Đồng Nai province: Cho Ro (South Bahnaric)
 Bình Thuận province: Chams (Chamic)

History

In 1962, the population of the Montagnard people in the Central Highlands was estimated to number as many as one million. Today, the population is approximately four million, of whom about one million are Montagnards. The 30 or so Montagnard tribes in the Central Highlands comprise more than six different ethnic groups who speak languages drawn primarily from the Malayo-Polynesian, Tai, and Austroasiatic language families. The main tribes, in order of population, are the Jarai, Rade, Bahnar, Koho, Mnong, and Stieng.

The Montagnard have a long history of tensions with the Vietnamese majority. While the Vietnamese are themselves heterogeneous, they generally share a common language and culture and have developed and maintained the dominant social institutions of Vietnam. The Montagnard do not share that heritage. There have been conflicts between the two groups over many issues, including land ownership, language and cultural preservation, access to education and resources, and political representation.

Originally inhabitants of the coastal areas of the region, they were driven to the uninhabited mountainous areas by the Chams and Cambodians beginning prior to the 9th century. Since then, they lived independently in the mountains up until the 19th century when the Vietnamese began to incorporate the territory.

French missionaries converted some Montagnard to the Catholic Church in the nineteenth century, but American missionaries converted more to Protestantism in the 1930s. Of the approximately one million Montagnard, close to half are Protestant, and around 200,000 are Roman Catholic. This made Vietnam's Communist Party suspicious of the Montagnard, particularly during the Vietnam War, since it was thought that they would be more inclined to help the heavily Christian American forces.

In 1950 the French government established the Central Highlands as the Pays Montagnard du Sud (PMS) under the authority of Vietnamese Emperor Bảo Đại, whom the French had installed as nominal chief of state in 1949 as an alternative to Ho Chi Minh's Democratic Republic of Vietnam. In the mid-1950s, the once-isolated Montagnard began experiencing more contact with outsiders after the Vietnamese government launched efforts to gain better control of the Central Highlands and, following the 1954 Geneva Accord, new ethnic minorities from North Vietnam moved into the area. As a result of these changes, Montagnard communities felt a need to strengthen some of their own social structures and to develop a more formal shared identity. When the French withdrew from Vietnam and recognized a Vietnamese sovereignty, Montagnard political independence was drastically diminished.

Vietnam War 

As the Vietnam War began to loom on the horizon, both South Vietnamese and American policy makers sought to begin training troops from minority groups in the Vietnamese populace. The U.S. Mission to Saigon sponsored the training of the Montagnard in unconventional warfare by American Special Forces. These newly trained Montagnard were seen as a potential ally in the Central Highlands area to stop Viet Cong activity in the region and a means of preventing further spread of Viet Cong sympathy. Later, their participation would become much more important as the Ho Chi Minh trail, the North Vietnamese supply line for Viet Cong forces in the south, grew. The U.S. military, particularly the Special Forces, developed base camps in the area and recruited the Montagnard.  The Montagnard were valued allies with their resolve, skills in tracking, and knowledge of the region; roughly 40,000 fought alongside American soldiers and became a major part of the U.S. military effort in the Highlands and I Corps, the northernmost region of South Vietnam. 

The Montagnards also cooperated with the Australians in addition to the Americans; the Australian Army Training Team Vietnam (AATTV) gained the support of many Montagnards by spending prolonged periods in different villages in the region, embracing their culture and gaining over a thousand recruits for the ARVN by 1964.

The central highlands were greatly affected by bombings and herbicides from the United States during the war to stop materiel transportation on the Ho Chi Minh trail. It is estimated that over 200,000 Montagnards died and 85% of their villages were destroyed during the Vietnam war.

In 1958, the Montagnard launched a movement known as BAJARAKA (the name is made up of the first letters of prominent tribes; similar to the later Nicaraguan Misurasata) to unite the tribes against the Vietnamese. There was a related, well-organized political and (occasionally) military force within the Montagnard communities known by the French acronym, FULRO, or United Front for the Liberation of Oppressed Races. FULRO's objectives were autonomy for the Montagnard tribes.

In 1967, the Viet Cong slaughtered 252 Montagnard in the village of Dak Son, home to 2,000 Highlanders, known as the Đắk Sơn massacre, in revenge for the Montagnard's support and allegiance with South Vietnam. In 1975, thousands of Montagnard fled to Cambodia after the fall of Saigon to the North Vietnamese Army, fearing that the new government would launch reprisals against them because they had aided the U.S. Army. The U.S. military resettled some Montagnard in the United States, primarily in North Carolina, but these evacuees numbered less than 2,000. In addition, the Vietnamese government has steadily displaced thousands of villagers from Vietnam's central highlands, to use the fertile land for coffee plantations.

Post Vietnam War 
Purges from the People's Army of Vietnam in 1976 and 1979 revealed that there were some Montagnards in its senior positions. FULRO continued the fight against the united Vietnamese government, the insurgency lasted into the mid 1980s.

Vietnam's south and center highlands were subjected to systematic state backed settlement by ethnic Vietnamese Kinh people. The original peoples of the Central Highlands experienced ruin during and after the Vietnam War; in the worst cases, they were driven from their land and became refugees.

In February 2001, thousands of Montagnards participated in mass protests demanding returns of ancestral lands and religious freedom. Other such protests took place in 2002, 2004, and 2008. The protests involved marches and sit ins. The nearby government officials reacted with military involvement and police arrests. Many Montagnards such as the Jarai were put on trial and imprisoned for years for their involvement in the protests. Some Montagnards residing in the United States also traveled to Washington, D.C. to protest and bring awareness to the Montagnards back in Vietnam. 

More than 1,000 Montagnard refugees have entered Ratanakiri and Mondulkiri, Cambodia, since 2001, raising issues of Cambodia's international law obligations toward refugees and its right to control its border. The government has a policy of deporting Degar refugees to Vietnam, viewing them as illegal immigrants to the country, and has threatened prosecution of Ratanakiri residents who aid them.  Human rights organizations have described this policy as a violation of Cambodia's international law obligation of non-refoulement (not forcibly returning refugees to a country in which they will be harmed).  Though the United Nations High Commissioner for Refugees has become involved processing asylum applications, refugees are often forcibly returned before they are able to apply for asylum. Many refugees have hidden in Ratanakiri's forests to avoid deportation.

In 2003, the group gained admittance to the Unrepresented Nations and Peoples Organization as the "Degar-Montagnards", but this membership was discontinued in 2016.

Outside of southeast Asia, the largest community of Montagnards in the world is located in Greensboro, North Carolina, US. Greensboro is also the home of several community and lobbying organizations, such as the Montagnard Foundation, Inc.

See also
 Rhade people (Anak Dagar) 
 Khmer Loeu 
 Lao Theung 
 Thủy Xá and Hỏa Xá
 Dieu Python movement
 List of ethnic groups in Vietnam
 Montagnais, a similar French term used in North America
 Social issues in Vietnam

References

Books
 Sidney Jones, Malcolm Smart, Joe Saunders, HRW. (2002). Repression of Montagnards: Conflicts Over Land and Religion in Vietnam's Central Highlands. Human Rights Watch. .
 United States Congress. Senate. Committee on Foreign. (1998). The Plight of the Montagnards: Hearing Before the Committee on Foreign Relations, United States Relations, Original from the Library of Congress .

Further reading
 Condominas, Georges. We Have Eaten the Forest: The Story of a Montagnard Village in the Central Highlands of Vietnam. New York: Hill and Wang, 1977. .
 Montagnard Foundation. Human Rights Violations: Montagnard Foundation Report, 2001: Report on the Situation of Human Rights Concerning the Montagnards or Degar Peoples of Vietnam's Central Highlands. Spartanburg, South Carolina: The Foundation, 2001.
 Montagnard Foundation. History of the Montagnard/Degar People: Their Struggle for Survival and Rights Before International Law. Spartanburg, South Carolina: The Foundation, 2001.

External links 

 Degar Foundation
 UNPO website: Degar-Montagnards

Culture of Vietnamese Central-Highlands
Ethnic groups in Vietnam
Indigenous peoples of Southeast Asia
Hill people